Operation Keelhaul was a forced repatriation of Russian civilians (non-Soviet citizens) and Soviet citizens to the Soviet Union.  While forced repatriation focused on Soviet Armed Forces POWs of Germany and Russian Liberation Army members, it included other Soviet citizens under Allied control. Refoulement, the forced repatriation of people in danger of persecution, is a human rights violation and breach of international law. Thus, Operation Keelhaul has been called a war crime, especially in regards to the many civilians forced into Soviet work camps, many of whom had never been Soviet citizens, having fled Russia before the end of the Russian Civil War.

The operation was carried out in Northern Italy and Germany by British and American forces between 14 August 1946 and 9 May 1947. Anti-communist Yugoslavs and Hungarians, including members of the fascist Ustaše regime that ran the Jasenovac concentration camp, were also forcibly repatriated to their respective governments.

Three volumes of records, entitled "Forcible Repatriation of Displaced Soviet Citizens-Operation Keelhaul," were classified Top Secret by the U.S. Army on September 18, 1948, and bear the secret file number 383.7-14.1.

Yalta Conference
One of the conclusions of the Yalta Conference was that the western Allies would return all Soviet citizens who found themselves in their zones to the Soviet Union. This immediately affected the liberated Soviet prisoners of war, but also extended to all Soviet citizens, irrespective of their wishes. In exchange, the Soviet government agreed to hand over several thousand western Allied prisoners of war whom they had liberated from German prisoner of war camps.

Treatment of prisoners and refugees
The refugee columns fleeing the Soviet-occupied parts of Europe included anti-communists, civilians, and Nazi collaborators from eastern European countries. They added to the mass of 'displaced persons' from the Soviet Union already in Western Europe, the vast majority of whom were Soviet prisoners of war and forced laborers (Ost-Arbeiter).

Soviet subjects who had volunteered for the German Army Ostlegionen and/or Waffen SS units were forcibly repatriated. These included Russian Cossacks of the XVth SS Cossack Cavalry Corps with their relatives, who were transported from the Western occupation zones of Allied-occupied Austria to the Soviet occupation zones of Austria and Allied-occupied Germany. Among those handed over were White émigré-Russians who had never been Soviet citizens, but who had fought for Nazi Germany against the Soviets during the war, including General Andrei Shkuro and the Ataman of the Don Cossack host Pyotr Krasnov. This was done despite the official statement of the British Foreign Office policy after the Yalta Conference, that only Soviet citizens who had been such after 1 September 1939, were to be compelled to return to the Soviet Union or handed over to Soviet officials in other locations (see the Repatriation of Cossacks after World War II).

The actual "Operation Keelhaul" was the last forced repatriation and involved the selection and subsequent transfer of approximately one thousand "Russians" from the camps of Bagnoli, Aversa, Pisa, and Riccione. Applying the "McNarney-Clark Directive", subjects who had served in the German Army were selected for shipment, starting on 14 August 1946. The transfer was codenamed "East Wind" and took place at St. Valentin in Austria on 8 and 9 May 1947. This operation marked the end of forced repatriations to the Soviet Union after World War II, and ran parallel to Operation Fling that helped Soviet defectors to escape from the Soviet Union.

On the other side of the exchange, the Soviet leadership found out that despite the demands set forth by Stalin, British intelligence was retaining a number of anti-Communist prisoners under orders from Churchill, with the intention of reviving "anti-Soviet operations". The 14th Waffen Grenadier Division, which was recruited from Ukrainians in Galicia were not repatriated, ostensibly because Galicia had belonged to Poland prior to September 1939, but in reality because MI6 wished to use the prisoners in future operations. The officer in charge of screening the 14th Division for war criminals, Fitzroy Maclean, admitted in an interview in 1989 that it was "fairly clear that there was every probability that there were war criminals amongst them", but argued that in the context of the Cold War, such men were needed to fight against the Soviet Union. On 23 March 1947, the United Kingdom granted asylum to the entire 14th Division, whose men were subsequently settled in the United Kingdom, Canada and Australia. The Soviet government protested against this decision, stating that most of the men in the division had previously served in German police units in Galicia and were deeply involved in perpetrating war crimes, but using a brief written by Pavlo Shandruk, an officer in the division as its basis, the Foreign Office issued a statement denying the 14th division had been involved in war crimes.

Critics
British historian and monarchist Nikolai Tolstoy described the scene of Americans returning to the internment camp after delivering a shipment of people to the Soviet authorities: "The Americans returned to Plattling visibly shamefaced. Before their departure from the rendezvous in the forest, many had seen rows of bodies already hanging from the branches of nearby trees." Notably, his accounts have been widely disputed by historians, who pointed out his reliance on three partial eyewitness accounts 40 years afterwards.

Nigel Nicolson, a former British Army captain, was Tolstoy's chief witness in the libel action brought by Lord Aldington. In 1995, he wrote: 
Fifty years ago I was a captain in the British Army, and with others I supervised the Jugoslav (Yugoslav) 'repatriation', as it was euphemistically called. We were told not to use force, and forbidden to inform them of their true destination. When they asked us where they were going, we replied that we were transferring them to another British camp in Italy, and they mounted the trains without suspicion. As soon as the sliding doors of the cattle-trucks were padlocked, our soldiers withdrew and Tito's partisans emerged from the station building where they had been hiding, and took over command of the train.

The prisoners and refugees could see them through cracks in the boarding, and began hammering on the insides of the wagons, shouting abuse at us for having betrayed them, lied to them, and sentenced at least the men among them to a grotesque death. There is now no doubt about their hideous fate, and to those of us on the spot there was little doubt then. Shortly after the first trainloads had been despatched, we heard the stories of the few survivors who escaped back to Austria, and thousands of manacled skeletons have since been disinterred in Slovenian pits.

Ghinghis Guirey, an American on one of the repatriation screening teams, reported:
The most unpleasant aspect of this unpleasant business was the fear these people displayed. Involuntarily one began to look over one's shoulder. I heard so many threats to commit suicide from people who feared repatriation that it became almost commonplace. And they were not fooling.

Aleksandr Solzhenitsyn called this operation "the last secret of World War II." He contributed to a legal defense fund set up to help Tolstoy, who was sued for libel in a 1989 case brought by Lord Aldington over war crimes allegations made by Tolstoy related to this operation. Tolstoy lost the case in the British courts; he avoided paying damages by declaring bankruptcy.

See also
 Swedish extradition of Baltic soldiers
 Western betrayal
 Repatriation of Cossacks after World War II
 Bleiburg repatriations
 Collaboration during World War II
 Russian Liberation Army
 Soviet repressions against former prisoners of war
 XVth SS Cossack Cavalry Corps

References

Books

Further reading
Tolstoy, Nikolai. Victims of Yalta, originally published in London, 1977. Revised edition 1979. 
Epstein, Julius. Operation Keelhaul, Devin-Adair, 1973.

External links
Return to the scene of the crime  Rutland Herald Online

Aftermath of World War II in the United Kingdom
Aftermath of World War II in the United States
Aftermath of World War II in the Soviet Union
American collusion with Soviet World War II crimes
British collusion with Soviet World War II crimes
People extradited to the Soviet Union
Post–World War II forced migrations
Soviet Union–United Kingdom relations
Soviet Union–United States relations